Partycrasher, released on November 5, 2013, through No Idea Records, is the fourth full-length album from the Massachusetts based melodic hardcore band A Wilhelm Scream, since changing their name from Smackin' Isaiah, and their sixth overall. It is their first full-length release following 2007's Career Suicide. Recorded in 2012, Produced and Engineered by Trevor J. Reilly and Mike Supina at Black and Blue Studio, and Anchor End Recording, both in New Bedford MA. Additional Engineering by James Whitten. Mixing done by Andrew Berlin and the crew at The Blasting Room.

The album is widely considered to be the heaviest of all of A Wilhelm Scream's releases and features the band using more heavy metal elements than their previous releases.

Track listing

Personnel
A Wilhelm Scream
 Nuno Pereira – vocals
 Trevor Reilly – guitar, backing vocals
 Mike Supina – lead guitar, backing vocals
 Brian J. Robinson – bass guitar, backing vocals
 Nicholas Pasquale Angelini – drums

References

2013 albums
A Wilhelm Scream albums